Duguay is a surname. Notable people with the surname include:

Calixte Duguay, CM (born 1939), multi-disciplinarian Canadian Artist
Christian Duguay (actor) (born 1970), American comic actor
Christian Duguay (director) (born 1957), Canadian director
Joseph Duguay (1816–1891), Quebec merchant and political figure
Joseph Nestor Duguay (1846–1907), businessman and political figure in Quebec
Joseph-Léonard Duguay (1900–1946), Member of the Canadian House of Commons and the Legislative Assembly of Quebec
Léo Duguay (born 1944), Progressive Conservative party member of the Canadian House of Commons
Shirley Duguay of Prince Edward Island, Canada went missing and was later found dead in a shallow grave
Normand Duguay (born 1941), former Canadian politician in the National Assembly of Quebec
Rachel Duguay (born 1975), American actress, voice actress, comedian, and television writer
Raôul Duguay (born 1939), artist, poet, musician, and political activist in the Canadian province of Quebec
Roger Duguay, former Canadian politician and Roman Catholic priest
Ron Duguay (born 1957), retired Canadian professional ice hockey player and coach
Yvette Duguay (1932–1986), American actress
René Duguay-Trouin, (1673–1736), famous French corsair of Saint-Malo

See also
French cruiser Duguay-Trouin (1923), the lead ship of a class of French light cruisers, launched in the early 1920s
French frigate Duguay-Trouin (D 611), F67 type large high-sea frigates of the French Marine Nationale
French ship Duguay-Trouin, a 74-gun ship of the line Duguay Trouin (1793–1794)
French ship Duguay-Trouin (1800) or HMS Implacable (1805), 74-gun third-rate ship of the line of the Royal Navy
Duguay-Trouin-class cruiser light cruisers were the first major French warships built after World War I